Shikoku Saburo Bridge is a bridge in Tokushima Prefecture, Shikoku that spans the Yoshino River. It joins Ojin-cho on the north of the river to Fudouhigashi-cho on the south of the river. The Bridge is 910.5 metres in length and 14 metres in width, with a two-lane highway running atop. The bridge was opened to the public in 1998.

The name is taken from the Saburo name, which is a popular name for third born
sons in Japan. The Yoshino River is regarded as one of the three great rivers in Japan, hence the name Saburo.

Bridges completed in 1998
Bridges in Japan
Roads in Tokushima Prefecture
Buildings and structures in Tokushima Prefecture